Edward Michael Daly (born August 16, 1965) is a retired four-star general in the United States Army who last served as the 20th commanding general of the U.S. Army Materiel Command from 2020 to 2023. He previously served as the deputy commanding general of Army Materiel Command from August 7, 2017 to July 2, 2020. 

In his previous assignment, Daly served as the Commanding General of Army Sustainment Command, where he executed Army Materiel Command's mission to deliver readiness. Prior to commanding ASC, he served as Army Materiel Command's Deputy Chief of Staff, overseeing the roles and functions of the Headquarters staff.

Education
Daly was raised in Jersey City, New Jersey where he attended St. Peter's Preparatory School and graduated in 1983.
Daly was commissioned as a second lieutenant in the United States Army Ordnance Corps upon his graduation from the United States Military Academy at West Point. He earned Master's degrees in Business Administration from Gonzaga University, and in Strategic Studies from the United States Army War College.

Military career
Daly was 37th Chief of Ordnance and Commandant of the United States Army Ordnance School. He also served as Executive Officer to the Deputy Chief of Staff, Army G-4; Commander of the 43rd Sustainment Brigade, 4th Infantry Division (Mechanized) at Fort Carson, Colorado, and deployed in support of Operation Enduring Freedom, Afghanistan; Deputy Assistant Chief of Staff/Chief Plans Officer, G-4, North Atlantic Treaty Organization Rapid Deployable Corps based in Italy and deployed in support of Operation Enduring Freedom and Operation Iraqi Freedom; and Commander of 702nd Main Support Battalion, Division Support Command, 2nd Infantry Division, Eighth Army, South Korea.

Earlier assignments as a company grade officer include various logistics and leadership roles with 1st Cavalry Division at Fort Hood, Texas; United States Army Europe; and Fort Bragg, North Carolina, where he deployed in support of Gulf War. He also served as Assistant Professor of Military Science at Gonzaga University in Spokane, Washington.

Awards and decorations

References

1965 births
Living people
United States Army personnel of the Gulf War
United States Army personnel of the Iraq War
United States Army personnel of the War in Afghanistan (2001–2021)
Gonzaga University alumni
Recipients of the Distinguished Service Medal (US Army)
Recipients of the Legion of Merit
United States Army generals
United States Army War College alumni
United States Military Academy alumni
People from Jersey City, New Jersey